Thomas Joseph Gerard Victory (24 December 1921 – 14 March 1995) was a prolific Irish composer. He wrote over two hundred works across many genres and styles, including tonal, serial, aleatoric and electroacoustic music.

Biography
Victory was born in Dublin, Ireland, in 1921 the son of a shopkeeper Thomas Victory and his wife, Delia (née Irwin). After schooling, he read Celtic Studies at University College, Dublin and Music at Trinity College Dublin, earning a doctorate in 1972.

In April 1948 Victory married Geraldine Herity, they had five children: Alma, Fiona, Isolde, Raymond, and Alan. Victory died in Dublin on 14 March 1995, aged 73. His papers are held in Trinity College and the Contemporary Music Centre hold a number of his scores.

Career
In terms of composition, Victory was mostly self-taught, although he received some formal training from John F. Larchet, Alan Rawsthorne and Walter Beckett. He also attended the "International Summer Courses for New Music" in Darmstadt, Germany.

In 1948 he was joint composer of music for a song in a play by Irish playwrightTeresa Deevy called Light Falling, this was performed by the Abbey Experimental Theatre Company in the Peacock Theatre, Dublin. His work was also part of the music event in the art competition at the 1948 Summer Olympics.

Victory's career was primarily in music administration, serving as Director of Music for Ireland's national broadcasting station RTÉ from 1967 to 1982. He was a president of UNESCO's International Rostrum of Composers, a Fellow of the Royal Irish Academy of Music and a recipient of the French Ordre des Arts et des Lettres and German Bundesverdienstkreuz.

Legacy
The Gerard Victory Commission is a prize has been named in his honour awarded to the most promising individual composer.

Selected works

Orchestral

Ensemble

Solo piano

Vocal

Operas

Band

Mixed media

Recordings
Three Irish Pictures, performed by RTÉ Sinfonietta, Proinseas Ó Duinn (cond.), on Marco Polo 8.223804 (CD, 1996).
Ultima Rerum, performed by Virginia Kerr (S), Bernadette Greevy (Mez), Adrian Thompson (T), Alan Opie (Bar), RTÉ Philharmonic Choir, National Chamber Choir, Cór na nÓg, National Symphony Orchestra of Ireland, Colman Pearce (cond.), on: Marco Polo 8.223532-3 (CD, 1997).
An Old Woman of the Roads, performed by Bernadette Greevy (Mez) and Hugh Tinney (pf), on: Marco Polo 8.225098 (CD, 1998).
Revel in Reel Time, performed by RTÉ Concert Orchestra, on: Celtic Collections CCD 135 (CD, 1999).
Songs from Lyonnesse, performed by National Chamber Choir of Ireland, Colin Mawby (cond.), on: Black Box BBM 1030 (CD, 2000).
Moresca, performed by Geraldine O'Doherty (hp), David O'Doherty (vn), Moya O'Grady (vc), on: Absolute Music [no label code] (CD, 2009).
 Prelude and Toccata, performed by Hugh Tinney, on: RTÉ lyric fm CD 153 (CD, 2016).

External links 
 Gerard Victory at The Teresa Deevy Archive
 Gerard Victory at The Abbey Theatre Archive

References

1921 births
1995 deaths
20th-century classical composers
Composers for piano
Irish classical composers
Irish male classical composers
Irish opera composers
Male opera composers
Musicians from Dublin (city)
Recipients of the Order of Merit of the Federal Republic of Germany
20th-century male musicians
Olympic competitors in art competitions